Pinus quadrifolia, the Parry pinyon, is a pine in the pinyon pine group native to southernmost California in the United States and northern Baja California in Mexico, from 33° 30' N south to 30° 30' N. The Parry pinyon has a lifespan of around 200 to 500 years. It is usually found in rocky areas that often have thin soil. It is scarce and often scattered in this region, forming open woodlands, usually mixed with junipers. Other common names include nut pine and fourleaf pinyon pine.

Description
The bark is thick, rough and scaly. The Parry pinyon begins to grow cones at around 10 to 20 years, and seed production is maximized at 50 or more years of age.

The cones open to  broad when mature, holding the seeds on the scales after opening. The jay, which uses the seeds as a food resource, stores many of the seeds for later use, and some of these stored seeds are not used and are able to grow into new trees. In addition to birds, rodents and other mammals can distribute its seeds.

Hybrids
The Parry pinyon frequently hybridises with single-leaf pinyon (P. monophylla) where their ranges meet in southern California and northern Baja California. Hybrids are distinguished by intermediate features, with needles usually fascicles of 2–3 with some stomata on the outer surface. It has been suggested by some botanists that the holotype specimen of P. quadrifolia is itself from a hybrid; presumed pure, non-hybrid specimens having been given the new name Pinus juarezensis, the Juárez pinyon, after the Sierra de Juárez of northern Baja California. However, there is no proof that these specimens are genetically 'purer' than the original type specimen, and few botanists accept P. juarezensis as other than a synonym of P. quadrifolia.

Fire Ecology and Effects 
The low density of organic material in areas where the Parry pinyon is found reduces the risk of fires spreading. However, due to low-hanging branches and thin bark, the Parry pinyon itself is susceptible to fire. Larger Parry pinyons can survive fires of low to moderate heat, but younger pinyons can be wiped out by fires. The Parry pinyon does not possess the ability to resprout after a fire.

Uses
The edible seeds, pine nuts, are collected throughout its range, though it is much less important than Colorado pinyon (P. edulis) for the crop. Parry pinyon is also occasionally planted as an ornamental tree and sometimes used as a Christmas tree. Due to the limited distribution of the species, the seeds of the Parry pinyon are not gathered commercially. They are more often consumed by birds, rodents (especially woodrats) and other mammals. The Cahuilla tribe of southern California used the resin to make a face cream commonly used by girls to prevent sunburn. The nuts were useful as well. For the Cahuilla, the nuts were given to the babies to eat as an alternative from breast milk and were also grounded then mixed with water as a beverage. The nuts were roasted and eaten whole or made into mush. They were important to the Cahuilla as a trade item with neighboring tribes. The pine needles and roots were used as material for basketry and the bark was a reliable substance for making the roofs of houses. The resin was a glue for mending pottery and reattaching arrowheads to the arrow shafts. The wood was burnt for firewood and incense, since it had high combustibility and it gave a pleasant smell.

The Diegueno also ate the nuts, but also the seeds as well.

References

External links
 Photo of cones. pinetum.org

quadrifolia
Flora of the California desert regions
Trees of Baja California
Trees of the Southwestern United States
Edible nuts and seeds